U
1997 Summer Universiade
Football at the Summer Universiade
1997
1997–98 in Italian football
1997 in South Korean football
1997 in American soccer